Justifier may refer to:

 Something which justifies
 In the theory of justification, something which justifies a belief
 Konami Justifier, a light gun used in video arcade and home console games
 "Justifier", a song by Australian pop/rock band Big Pig
 Justifier, fictional flying ship in the Marvel Comics universe, used by vigilante team The Jury
 Justifier, an alternate Dungeons & Dragons character class
 Justifiers RPG, a tabletop role-playing game